The Queen's Cup is a golf tournament on the Asian Tour and is played in Thailand. The inaugural tournament was held in 2009 at the Santiburi Samui Country Club and the prize fund was US$300,000. Chinnarat Phadungsil won the tournament and won $47,550.

The event was played at Santiburi Samui Country Club until 2018. There were two events in 2018. An event was held at Phoenix Gold Golf and Country Club in late June and early July and a  second event was held later in the season at the Legacy Golf Club, in late November and early December.

Winners

External links
Coverage on Asian Tour's official site

Former Asian Tour events
Golf tournaments in Thailand
Recurring sporting events established in 2009
2009 establishments in Thailand